Imsland is a former municipality in Rogaland county, Norway.  The  municipality existed from 1923 until its dissolution in 1965.  The municipality included the area surrounding the inner part of the Vindafjorden in the present-day municipalities of Suldal and Vindafjord.  The administrative centre of Imsland was the village of Imslandsjøen where Imsland Church is located.

History
The municipality was created on 1 January 1923 when the large municipality of Vikedal was split into three.  The southeastern part of Vikedal became the municipality of Imsland.  Initially, Imsland had a population of 604.  The municipality existed for 42 years before it was dissolved in a merger brought upon by the recommendations of the Schei Committee.  On 1 January 1965, the part of Imsland located south of the Vindafjorden (population: 61) was merged into the neighboring Suldal municipality. The rest of Imsland (population: 372) was merged with Sandeid and parts of Vikedal, Vats, and Skjold municipalities to form the new municipality of Vindafjord.

Government
All municipalities in Norway, including Imsland, are responsible for primary education (through 10th grade), outpatient health services, senior citizen services, unemployment and other social services, zoning, economic development, and municipal roads.  The municipality is governed by a municipal council of elected representatives, which in turn elects a mayor.

Municipal council
The municipal council  of Imsland was made up of representatives that were elected to four year terms.  The party breakdown of the final municipal council was as follows:

See also
List of former municipalities of Norway

References

Suldal
Vindafjord
Former municipalities of Norway
1923 establishments in Norway
1965 disestablishments in Norway